Afridun ibn Karan was a Baduspanid prince, who came from a collateral line of the family, known as the Afridunids. He seized the throne in 884, thus overthrowing the main branch of the family descended from Baduspan I and initiating the rule of the Afridunids, who would rule until 937, when Shahriyar III ibn Jamshid of the Shahriyarid branch established his rule.

References

Sources 
 

9th-century monarchs in the Middle East
9th-century Iranian people
Baduspanids